Abel Muñoz (born 24 October 1951) is a Salvadoran former swimmer. He competed in two events at the 1968 Summer Olympics.

References

1951 births
Living people
Salvadoran male swimmers
Olympic swimmers of El Salvador
Swimmers at the 1968 Summer Olympics
People from Usulután Department